Oluwajuwonlo Iledare (born 6 June 1986), professionally known as Jaywon, is a Nigerian singer, songwriter, performer, producer and actor (army of the thieves). Following his departure from Kennis Music, he founded the Next World Music record label in 2013. In 2009, the Nigerian Music Video Awards presented Jaywon with the Best New Artist award. He also won the award for Best Recording at The Headies 2013 and the Tush Awards for 'This Year song.

Life and career

Jaywon completed his primary education at ECWA Primary School, then moved on to Government Secondary School in Kogi State for his secondary schooling before graduating with an HND in Accounting from Federal Polytechnic, Bida.

The singer then moved to Lagos in 2005 and under a year after, secured collaborations with Ray G, Sound Sultan, W4, Slizzy E and 2face.

Jaywon was given the opportunity to sing at the Kennis Music Easter Fiesta in 2009, and he made such an impression that the event's organizers were immediately interested in him. Jaywon signed a record deal with Kennis Music Record Label later that year. 'Jaywon has one of the most recognisable voices in the industry,' he was once said..'  In December 2012, He released the single 'Odun Yi (This Year)'to critical and commercial acclaim. PZ Cusson later inked an endorsement arrangement with him, allowing the firm to exploit his popular song, "This Year," for promotional purposes which enabled the company use his hit song, ‘This Year’ for promotional purposes.

Next World Music and 'Oba Orin' album
After going indie, he released his anticipated and third album titled 'Oba Orin' after four singles featuring Vector, Reminisce and Reekado Banks. This is the follow up to the two albums he released on Kennis Music.

360nobs reviewed the album writing: 
'Oba Orin is a fine collection of sounds that reflects Jaywon's superior talent and the state of pop music. It is rich, live, refreshing, timely and timeless all at once. Jaywon may make a bold claim but none can say he doesn't work for it every step of the way. Only time will tell if he has indeed earned the title.'

while PulseNG rates it 3/5 and wrote: 
'By the end of the album, you get a feeling that Jaywon has poured out his soul, connecting his influences and having his very creative essence flowing through you. It's like Jaywon performed personally for you, in a crowded local venue.'

'Oba Orin' which translates to 'King of Songs' from Yoruba language is an album with 21 tracks which production credits from Mr Ejor, Benjossy, Blaq Jerzey and Young Jonn. Jaywon gave first two weeks return of his 'Oba Orin' album to an Orphanage. The singer attended the 2016 ACIA Awards in Atlanta, United States and bagged the “Best Indigenous Act” award.

Jaywon premiered the remix for "Madantin" in 2014 featuring Phyno, Olamide and May D under the Next World Music imprint then following up with 'Tanawole' featuring Reminisce  weeks after. He also worked with rapper Vector tha Viper on 'Back to Sender.'

2016–present: Aje (The Mixtape)
On June 25, 2020 Jaywon drops his ten-track album titled Aje (The Mixtape), it features vocals from Next World Music's new Signee, Save Fame, as well as Zlatan, Lyta, Barry Jhay, Phyno, Magnito, IDYL, Danny S, Qdot, Keke Ogungbe, DMC Ladida, Alijiita, and Umu Obiligbo, among others, with production credits from irockclassic, Blaq Jerzee, Soularge, Don Adah, Tefa, Phynest, and Xsmile.

Discography

Albums/EPs
Meet Jaywon - 2009

Meet Jaywon Reloaded - 2011

This Year (Odun Yi) - 2013

Oba Orin - 2016

Aje the mixtape (EP) - 2020

Jahbahlee - 2022

Singles

Awards and nominations

References

External links
Jaywon Website

Living people
Musicians from Lagos
Nigerian male singer-songwriters
Nigerian hip hop singers
The Headies winners
1986 births
Yoruba-language singers
21st-century Nigerian  male singers